This article presents the discography of American pop singer Michael Bolton. Since 1975, Bolton has released 24 studio albums and 35 singles. Regarded as the “King of Blue-eyed Soul”, Bolton has sold 75 million records worldwide, making him one of the best-selling music artists in history. According to RIAA, Bolton has sold 28 million certified album units in the United States, including six multi-platinum records. Billboard ranked him as the 83rd Greatest artist of all time and has attained 9 No. 1 hits on US Adult Contemporary Chart. 

"Time, Love & Tenderness" remains his biggest-selling album to date, with over 16 million copies sold worldwide. Bolton's second best-seller is "Soul Provider", which attained 6× Platinum status in the US and over 12.5 million copies globally. Another big seller is "Timeless: The Classics", an album of covers that reached 4× Platinum in the US and sold 7 million copies worldwide.

Albums

Studio albums

Compilation albums

Singles

1970s–1980s

1990s

2000s

2010s

Music videos

Other appearances

References

Pop music discographies
Discographies of American artists